Eaco Films was an American film studio founded in New York City in 1914 by M. C. Goldman, Edward E. Anderson (brother of G. M. Anderson), and Edwin August. Benjamin Zeidman was the advertising and publicity manager. The company was named from the initials of Edward Anderson/Edwin August  (E. A. Co.). Eaco went bankrupt after a few months.

References

Mass media companies established in 1914
Mass media companies disestablished in 1914
Defunct American film studios
1914 establishments in New York City
1914 disestablishments in New York (state)